Vuyo is a South African masculine given name that may refer to
Vuyo Dabula (born 1976), South African actor
Vuyo Mbotho (born 1988), South African rugby union player
Vuyo Mbuli (1967–2013), South African television personality and news presenter
Vuyo Mere (born 1984), South African football defender
Vuyo Chulayo (born 1990), South African pastor and pharmacist technician